Catapult centres are organisations set up from 2011 onwards by Innovate UK in the United Kingdom to promote research and development through business-led collaboration between scientists and engineers to exploit market opportunities. They receive grants from public funds but are also expected to seek commercial funding.

History 
In 2010, the Department for Business, Innovation and Skills commissioned a report on technical innovation from Hermann Hauser, an entrepreneur who had been active in information technology since 1978. The report recommended the establishment of a number of Technology and Innovation Centres.

Each centre received "core" funding of £10 million per year for five years via the Technology Strategy Board (which since 2014 has used the name Innovate UK). Since 2018, Innovate UK has been a council of United Kingdom Research and Innovation, a non-departmental public body.

It was intended that the long-term split would be one-third core funding, one-third commercial funding, and one-third collaborative (public and private) research & development funding.

Centres

The current centres, with their operational dates and locations, are as follows.
 Cell & Gene Therapy – October 2012 – at Guy's Hospital, London.
Connected Places – April 2019, replacing the Transport Systems and Future Cities catapult centres.
Digital – June 2013 – in Kings Cross, London.
 High Value Manufacturing – October 2011 – seven Technology and Innovation centres working with companies of all sizes to bridge the gap in, and accelerate the activity between technology concept and commercialisation. These include:
 The Centre for Process Innovation – at Redcar, North Yorkshire.
The National Composites Centre – at the Bristol and Bath Science Park.
Warwick Manufacturing Group – at the University of Warwick.
 Offshore Renewable Energy – March 2013 – wind, wave and tidal power, in Glasgow and Blyth, Northumberland. The National Renewable Energy Centre (Narec) at Blyth merged with ORE in 2014.
 Satellite Applications – December 2012 – at Harwell Science and Innovation Campus, Oxfordshire.
 Energy Systems – April 2015 – in Birmingham.
 Medicines Discovery – December 2015 – at Alderley Park, Cheshire; absorbed the former Precision Medicines Catapult in 2017.
 Compound Semiconductor Applications – 2016 – in Newport, South Wales.

2017 report 
The Department for Business, Energy and Industrial Strategy commissioned a report from Ernst & Young which was published in November 2017 following the completion of the five-year funding of the first centres.

The report found that approximately £1.25 billion had been received by the centres, of which about £745 million came from the public sector. Of the then established Catapult centres, only the High-Value Manufacturing Catapult had achieved its funding targets, with the others heavily reliant on public funding. The report criticised the strategies, governance and performance management of most of the centres, and made 38 recommendations. Three centres – Digital, Future Cities and Transport Systems – were identified as in need of remedial plans, with the possibility of halting their further funding.

2018 funding 
In August 2018, the government announced funding totalling £780 million to be provided to several of the centres, over the next five years.

References

External links
 

 
Department for Business, Innovation and Skills
Science and technology in the United Kingdom